The Wills Wing U2 is an American high-wing, single-place, hang glider, designed and produced by Wills Wing of Orange, California since 2003. The aircraft is supplied complete and ready-to-fly.

Design and development 
The U2 was conceived as a recreational intermediate glider with performance nearing that of competition gliders, like the Wills Wing T2. The U2 is made from 7075 aluminium alloy tubing, with the 84% double-surface wing covered in Dacron sailcloth. The U2 includes a variable geometry (VG) system that tensions the sail for higher glide performance.

The two models available are each named for their wing area in square feet.

The glider is also sold by Tecma Sport of France as the Techma Sport U2.

Variants 
U2 145
Small-sized model for lighter pilots. Its  span wing is cable-braced from a single king post. The glider model was HGMA certified in 2003.
U2 160
Large-sized model for heavier pilots. Its  span wing is cable braced from a single kingpost. The glider model was HGMA certified in 2003.

Specifications (U2 145)

References

External links 

Official U2 owners manual

U2
Hang gliders